The Yamatai Kyushu Theory is the theory that the Yamatai kingdom was located in Kyushu rather than in Honshu as the Yamatai Honshu Theory proposes.

The theory proposes that the original capital of Japan was located in Kyushu, and when the Kofun period began, the Yamato Kingship moved the capital east to the Kinai region, before eventually moving it to Kyoto, and finally Tokyo, the current capital.

Overview 

The Yamato District, Fukuoka is located in the Yamato Province of Chikugo Province, in his "Foreign Affairs Record", Chikugo Province, Yamato District, Fukuoka. Since then, the mainstream of academic circles has been divided into two mainstream theories: the "Honshu theory (by Naitō Torajirō and others) and the "Kyushu theory (by Shiratori Kurakichi and others). The Kyūshū theory, however, has a different explanation. The Kyushu theory, however, is divided into two camps: one that claims that the Yamataikoku was "moved" (the "To-kyo" theory) and the other that it was not. The "To-sen" theory says that the Yamataikoku moved to the Kinai area and became the Yamato Kingdom.

There are two theories about the subsequent Yamatai Kingdom; one is that it was conquered by the Kinai forces, and the other is that it moved eastward and conquered the Kinai. In the past, it was the first time that the Japanese government had been involved in the war.

Basic rationale 
The basic arguments for the Kyushu theory of the Yamatai Kingdom include the following.

Basis 

 Considering the distance from Obikata-gun to the Queen's country as an itinerary rather than a straight line, out of the 12,000 ri, it took 10,500 ri to get to Itokuni, which is located in Fukuoka Prefecture, and the remaining 1,500 ri (three times the distance of 500 ri from Suiroku to Itokuni, which is located in Karatsu City, Saga Prefecture), is not enough to locate the Yamatai Kingdom beyond Kyushu.
 Comparing the Gounakukoku, which was in conflict with the Yamataikoku, to the power of Kumamoto (Kuma), the official of the Gounakukoku, "Goukochi Heigu," is a transliteration of "Kikuchihiko.
 Based on the view that the "burial chamber with coffin and no burial chamber" that describes the burial method of the Yamataikoku in the Book of Records of the Wei Dynasty is considered to be a jar coffin, many jar coffins have been excavated in the Kitakyushu region, and many tombs with sarcophagus and no burial chamber have appeared. Also, from the description of "no burial chamber," burial tombs in the Kinai region with a burial chamber are not applicable.
 There is a theory that the Hashibashi grave mound, which is said to be the oldest stylized forward and backward circular mound in Nara Prefecture Sakurai City, was built in the latter half of the 3rd century and is considered to be Himiko's burial mound. However, after the death of Himiko, a male king ascended to the throne, but it is recorded that the country was in turmoil again, and it is almost impossible to build a burial mound with the largest mound at that time when the country was in turmoil. In addition, there are no traces of martyrdom in the area surrounding the tomb. Also, the tombs of neighboring places such as the Korean Peninsula at that time were all around 30 meters on each side, and it is unreasonable to assume that Japan was the only country to build a huge tomb (Chopsticks Tomb). In addition, the Museum, Archaeological Institute of Kashihara, Nara Prefecture, which conducted the Archaeological excavation of the Hokenoyama burial mound, which is said to predate the Chopsticks Tomb in terms of age. Archaeological Institute of Kashihara, Nara Prefecture, who conducted Excavation of the Hokenoyama burial mound in 2008, concluded that the burial mound was built in the middle of the 3rd century based on the excavated artifacts. Because the range of Radiocarbon dating results of burial chamber wood is reported to include the first half of the 4th century, some have questioned the dating of the middle of the 3rd century.

Advocates 
Advocates of the Kyushu theory of the Yamataikoku include Arai Hakuseki, Shiratori Kurakichi, Dairoku Harada, Taku Tanaka, Takehiko Furuta, Kenzaburo Torigoe, Toshiaki Wakai, Biten Yasumoto, Toshio Hoga and others. In addition, it is said that research based on domestic materials such as "Kiki" tends not to be taken into consideration, despite the indications of Taro Sakamoto's "The Birth of the Nation" and Hidesaburo Hara, and Toshiaki Wakai said about this tendency before the war. He criticizes the repressed theory of Sokichi Tsuda as being caused by being touted even after the war.

See also 

 Yamatai
 Wajinden
  a related conspiracy theory 
 Yamatai Honshu Theory

Footnotes

Annotations

Sources 

Hypotheses
Pages with unreviewed translations
Yamatai